Manuel López may refer to:

Footballers
Travieso (footballer) (Manuel López Llamosas, 1900–1975), Spanish football forward
Manuel López (Chilean footballer) (born 1972), Chilean football defender
Manuel López Mondragón (born 1983), Mexican football defender
Manolo (footballer, born 1985) (Manuel López Escámez), Spanish football midfielder
Manuel López (Guatemalan footballer) (born 1990), Guatemalan defender
Manuel López (Argentine footballer) (born 1995), Argentine football forward

Others
Manuel López (boxer) (1929–1954), Argentine lightweight Olympian
Manuel López Ochoa (1933–2011), Mexican actor
Manuel López Villarreal (born 1958), Mexican politician
Manuel López (artist) (born 1983), American educator

See also
Manuel Lopes (disambiguation)
Manny Lopez (disambiguation)